Ambelikou is a village in Cyprus, west of Lefka. De facto, it is under the control of Northern Cyprus.

History 
From the Ottoman period until the outbreak of intercommunal violence, Ampelikou was a mixed village with a Turkish Cypriot majority. The 1831 census recorded 55 Turkish Cypriot and 11 Greek Cypriot male adult residents. The village's population increased from 308 in 1831 to a peak of 641 in 1946; during the same period, the share of the Greek Cypriot population rose from 17% to 26.5%.

References

Communities in Nicosia District
Populated places in Lefke District